Hearts of Oak may refer to:

“Heart of Oak”, the official march of the Royal Navy and other navies
Hearts of Oak (New York militia), a volunteer military unit formed during the American Revolutionary War
Hearts of Oak (Ireland), an agrarian protest society in the province of Ulster, Ireland
Hearts of Oak (play), an 1879 play by James Herne and David Belasco
Hearts of Oak (1914 film), a 1914 film directed by Wray Physioc
Hearts of Oak (film), a 1924 film directed by John Ford
Heart of Oak (film), a 2022 film directed by Laurent Charbonnier and Michel Seydoux
Hearts of Oak (album), an album by the band Ted Leo and the Pharmacists
Hearts of Oak Benefit Society, a 19th-Century British Benefit Society
Hearts of Oak Friendly Society, a British Friendly Society and successor to the Benefit Society
Accra Hearts of Oak SC, a football (soccer) club from Ghana
Hearts of Oak (supporters group), a football (soccer) supporters group for New York City Football Club
 - one of three vessels named "Heart of Oak" that served the British Royal Navy
Hearts of Oak (campaign group), a far-right campaign group founded by Tommy Robinson